Günter Stratmann (born 8 January 1931) is a German fencer. He competed in the individual events at the 1956 Summer Olympics for the United Team of Germany.

References

External links
 

1931 births
Living people
German male fencers
Olympic fencers of the United Team of Germany
Fencers at the 1956 Summer Olympics
Sportspeople from Hamm